The knockout stage of 1974 FIFA World Cup was a single-elimination tournament involving the four teams that qualified from the second group stage of the tournament. There were two matches: a third place play-off contested by the group runners-up, and the final to decide the champions, contested by the group winners. The knockout stage began with the third place play-off on 6 July and ended with the final on 7 July 1974, both at the Olympiastadion in Munich. West Germany won the tournament with a 2–1 victory over the Netherlands.

All times Central European Time (UTC+1)

Qualified teams
The top two placed teams from each of the two groups of the second round qualified for the knockout stage.

Third place play-off

Final

References

External links
 1974 FIFA World Cup archive

1974 FIFA World Cup
1974
Netherlands at the 1974 FIFA World Cup
West Germany at the 1974 FIFA World Cup
Brazil at the 1974 FIFA World Cup
Poland at the 1974 FIFA World Cup